The Baharlu, also spelled Bahārlou, Baharloo, Baharlooe, are a Turkic ethnic group living in Hamadan, Fars, Kerman, Azerbaijan and Khorasan in Iran. Fārs embraces the balk of Baharlu tribe members and is identified as the provenance of the tribe 

The Baharlu was one of the Qizilbash tribes. Many Baharlus live in the district of Darab, home to the army of Darius the great. There are also a number of Baharlus which in the 14th century settled down in areas around Shahr-e Kord in Chahar Mahal and Bakhtiari, they got heavily mixed with the Bakhtiaris and Qashqais.

Prominent Baharlus
Ahmadreza Baharloo – host of the Persian section of Voice of America (VOA)

See also
Darab
Bakhtiari
Qashqai
Shahrekord
 Iranian Turks

References

Further reading
 

Ethnic groups in Iran
Nomadic groups in Iran
Turkoman tribes
Ethnic groups in the Middle East